Far EasTone Telecommunications (Far EasTone/FET) is a telecommunications company based in Taiwan. It is the third largest behind Chunghwa Telecom and Taiwan Mobile.

History
Far EasTone was founded in October 1996 by the Far Eastern Group, in a joint venture with AT&T. The company was awarded two wireless (GSM 900 and GSM 1800) service licenses in January 1997. The following year, Far EasTone launched its service and became the first company to introduce a fully integrated dual-band system.

Far EasTone was the first Taiwanese company to offer the Java 32K SIM Toolkit, mobile banking, mobile commerce, real-time access to financial, entertainment and headline news, mobile fax/mail, logo download and e-coupons. In March 1999, after fourteen months in business, Far EasTone achieved one million revenue-producing customers, faster than any other GSM operator.

The company was listed on the Taiwan OTC Stock Exchange in December 2001 under the ticker code 4904 and was officially listed on the Taiwan Stock Exchange in the electronic sector in August 2005. In September 2006, Far EasTone began providing 3G WCDMA services.

On December 16, 2009, Far EasTone acquired WiMAX licenses, and from December 22 began offering WiMAX transmission services. On October 30, 2013, Taiwan's LTE standard license bidding closed with Far EasTone paying NT$31.315 billion for the LTE frequency bands (700 MHz A2/1800 MHz C3, C4), with a total bandwidth of 30 MHz. Far EasTone launched LTE services on June 3, 2014.

List of presidents
Joseph O'Konek (May 1998 – 30 June 2002)
Jan Nilsson (1 September 2002 – September 2010)
Yvonne Li (10 September 2010 – January 2019)
Chee Ching (since 7 January 2019)

Mobile Network Information (Radio Frequency Summary)

Mergers and acquisitions
A deal was reached in that July, only to fall through in August. Another round of negotiations produced a second agreement in October 2003. In April 2004, the merger was finalized, and became the largest ever acquisition in the Taiwanese telecom industry. In February 2005, Far EasTone bought a 55.3% stake in Arcoa. In May 2005, Far EasTone formally merged with Yuan-Ze Telecom. In May 2007, the company bought a 51% equity interest in Q-ware Communications to extend the scope of its wireless communications services.

In August 2007, Singtel transferred its 24.5% stake in New Century Infocomm Tech company for a 3.5 per cent share of Far EasTone. On April 30, 2009, it was announced that China Mobile would invest up to 12 per cent into the company. The amount of foreign ownership was projected to be: NTT DoCoMo at 4.1 per cent, SingTel at 3.5 per cent, China Mobile at 12 per cent. On April 27, 2012, Singtel sold its 3.98% share of Far EasTone. On April 18, 2013, China Mobile announced the termination of a stake in Far EasTone, though the parties signed a bilateral cooperation agreement.

According to a July 5, 2015 article in The Wall Street Journal, there was a consortium seeking to buy cable television company  from the private equity firm MBK Partners LP, led by the company and Morgan Stanley.

FarEasTone announced in February 2022 that the company would acquire  in a stock swap.

Subscribers and market share
The total number of subscribers between the Company and KGT was 6.13 million at the end of December 2008. In the Taiwan mobile market (2 & 3G) the market shares were as follows: Chunghwa Telecom at 35%, Taiwan Mobile at 25%, Far EasTone at 24%, Asia Pacific Telecom and Vibo Telecom at 10%, and PHS at 6%. The company, along with other leading Taiwan companies, has recently (April 29, 2016) been raising prices.

See also
 List of companies of Taiwan

References

External links

Members of the Conexus Mobile Alliance
Companies listed on the Taiwan Stock Exchange
Companies based in Taipei
Mobile phone companies of Taiwan
Telecommunications companies of Taiwan
Taiwanese brands
Telecommunications companies established in 1997
1997 establishments in Taiwan
Far Eastern Group